Games played (most often abbreviated as G or GP) is a statistic used in team sports to indicate the total number of games in which a player has participated (in any capacity); the statistic is generally applied irrespective of whatever portion of the game is contested. In baseball, the statistic applies also to players who, prior to a game, are included on a starting lineup card or are announced as ex ante substitutes, whether or not they play; however, in Major League Baseball, the application of this statistic does not extend to consecutive games played streaks. A starting pitcher, then, may be credited with a game played even if he is not credited with a game started or an inning pitched. In baseball and softball, the second baseman is a fielding position in the infield, commonly stationed between second and first base. The second baseman often possesses quick hands and feet, needs the ability to get rid of the ball quickly, and must be able to make the pivot on a double play. In addition, second basemen are almost always right-handed. Only four left-handed throwing players have appeared as second basemen in the major leagues since 1950; one of the four, Gonzalo Márquez, was listed as the second baseman in the starting lineup for two games in 1973, batting in the first inning, but was replaced before his team took the field on defense, and none of the other three players lasted even a complete inning at the position. In the numbering system used to record defensive plays, the second baseman is assigned the number 4.

The second baseman is frequently the smallest player on the team, and the ability of such smaller players to absorb the impact of play has contributed to many long careers at the position throughout major league history; three-quarters of the second basemen elected to the Baseball Hall of Fame have been under 6' tall. Eddie Collins, the first major league player to appear in 2,500 games at a single position, is the all-time leader with 2,650 career games as a second baseman. Joe Morgan (2,527), Roberto Alomar (2,320), Lou Whitaker (2,308), Nellie Fox (2,295), Charlie Gehringer (2,206), Robinson Canó (2,165), Willie Randolph (2,152), Frank White (2,151), Bid McPhee (2,129), Bill Mazeroski (2,094), Nap Lajoie (2,035), and Jeff Kent (2,034) are the only other second baseman to play over 2,000 games at the position.

Key

List

Stats updated as of the end of the 2022 season.

Other Hall of Famers

Notes

References

External links

Major League Baseball statistics
Games played as a second baseman